The 2013 Türk Telecom İzmir Cup was a professional tennis tournament played on hard courts. It was the sixth edition of the tournament which was part of the 2013 ATP Challenger Tour. It took place in İzmir, Turkey between 16 and 22 September 2013.

Singles main-draw entrants

Seeds

 1 Rankings are as of September 9, 2013.

Other entrants
The following players received wildcards into the singles main draw:
  Tuna Altuna
  Barış Ergüden
  Anıl Yüksel
  Efe Yurtacan

The following players received entry from the qualifying draw:
  Andrés Artuñedo Martínavarr
  Teodor-Dacian Crăciun
  David Rice
  Louk Sorensen

Champions

Singles

 Mikhail Kukushkin def.  Louk Sorensen 6–1, 6–4

Doubles

 Austin Krajicek /  Tennys Sandgren def.  Brydan Klein /  Dane Propoggia 7–6(7–4), 6–4

External links
Official Website

 
Turk Telecom Izmir Cup
2013 in Turkish tennis
September 2013 sports events in Turkey